Anime Festival Wichita (Anime Festival of Wichita or AFW) is an annual three-day anime convention held in June or August at the Hyatt Regency Wichita in Wichita, Kansas.

Programming
The convention typically offers an Anime Music Video contest, anime viewing rooms, costume contests, manga library, panels, tabletop gaming, vendors, and video gaming tournaments. The convention has 24-hour programming.

History
Anime Festival Wichita started in 2005 as a one-day event under the name Wichita Anime Festival. Voice actress Cassandra Hodges was scheduled to attend in 2011, but died prior to the convention. Anime Festival Wichita 2020 and 2021 was cancelled due to the COVID-19 pandemic.

Event history

References

Other Related News Articles
Let's Revisit The Blackwell Journal at Anime Festival Wichita 2019 Blackwell Journal-Tribune, Retrieved 30 June 2022

External links
Anime Festival Wichita Website

Anime conventions in the United States
Recurring events established in 2005
2005 establishments in Kansas
Annual events in Kansas
Festivals in Kansas
Culture of Wichita, Kansas
Tourist attractions in Wichita, Kansas
Conventions in Kansas